is a Japanese actress and fashion model.

Shirata's affiliation office originally Flos, after passing through Blenden on the way, as of 2013 she is no with Adesso. She graduated from Horikoshi High School. Shirata has an older brother who is nine years older.

Biography
In 1998, after being scouted Shirata made her debut in the television drama Bishōjo H (Fuji Television). She changed to the film actress route in 2003, and her name changed to hiragana . For Shirata's first time in the same year's publicly released film Kanzen naru Shiiku: Himitsu no Chikashitsu she challenged to be nude. In 2006, she was elected Miss International Japan Champion, he participated in the 2007 World Competition and entered "Top 15" and was chosen as "Miss Photogenic". Shirata married professional golfer Ryuichi Aoki in 2015. On 11 February 2016, she announced her first child pregnancy. In 5 May, Shirata gave birth to her first child.

Filmography

TV dramas

Other than TV dramas

Films

Advertisements

Magazines

Stills

DVD

Shows

Stage

References

External links
 
 (August 2006 – ) 
 (October 2004 – August 2006) 

Japanese television personalities
Japanese female models
People from Kōchi Prefecture
1982 births
Living people
Horikoshi High School alumni
20th-century Japanese actresses
21st-century Japanese actresses